Slnečný kalendár is the third solo album by Slovak recording artist Marika Gombitová released on OPUS in 1982.

Track listing 

{{tracklist
| collapsed       = yes
| extra_column    = Featured artist(s)
| total_length    = 79:07
| headline        = Slnečný kalendár: Collectors Edition (Bonus CD)
| title11         = Modus 
| note11          = taken from Modus
| extra11         = Ján Lehotský and Miroslav Žbirka
| length11        = 2:47

| title12         = Slávnosť kvetín
| note12          = taken from Modus
| length12        = 3:39

| title13         = Jedenásť poschodí
| note13          = taken from Modus
| length13        = 3:15

| title14         = Pripútaná
| note14          = taken from ''Modus
| length14        = 4:58

| title15         = Domy na zbúranie
| note15          = taken from Modus
| length15        = 5:27

| title16         = Balíček snov
| note16          = taken from Balíček snov
| extra16         = Lehotský
| length16        = 5:20

| title17         = Neprichádzaš
| note17          = taken from Balíček snov
| extra17         = Lehotský
| length17        = 4:47

| title18         = Báječní muži na lietajúcich strojoch
| note18          = taken from Balíček snov
| length18        = 3:23

| title19         = Blúdim
| note19          = taken from Balíček snov
| length19        = 3:32

| title20         = Dotyk
| note20          = taken from 99 zápaliek
| length20        = 5:10

| title21         = Zimný park
| note21          = taken from 99 zápaliek
| extra21         = Lehotský
| length21        = 3:09

| title22         = Záhradná kaviareň
| note22          = taken from Záhradná kaviareň
| length22        = 4:00

| title23         = Tajomstvo hier
| note23          = taken from Záhradná kaviareň
| extra23         = Lehotský
| length23        = 4:40

| title24         = Haliere
| note24          = taken from Záhradná kaviareň
| extra24         = Lehotský
| length24        = 4:53

| title25         = Rock Is Not Dead
| note25          = taken from Modus| extra25         = Lehotský and Žbirka
| length25        = 2:47

| title26         = My Train to Eden
| note26          = taken from Modus| length26        = 3:39

| title27         = Take Me to the Moonlight
| note27          = taken from Modus| length27        = 3:15

| title28         = You Went Away
| note28          = taken from Modus| length28        = 4:58

| title29         = Lonely Night
| note29          = taken from Modus| length29        = 5:27
}}

Official releases
 1982: Slnečný kalendár, LP, MC, OPUS, #9113 1259
 1995: Slnečný kalendár, CD, re-release, Open Music #0026 2331
 2002: Slnečný kalendár: Komplet 3, 4 bonus tracks, CD, Sony Music/Bonton, #50 7832
 2004: Slnečný kalendár: Komplet 3, 4 bonus tracks, CD, OPUS, #91 1259
 2008: Slnečný kalendár: 2CD Collectors Edition, bonus CD, OPUS, #91 2792

Credits and personnel

 Marika Gombitová - lead vocal
 Ján Lehotský - lead vocal, chorus, keyboards, writer
 Anastasis Engonidis - bass, chorus
 Ján Hangoni - solo guitar, chorus
 Karol Morvay - drum, chorus
 Ján Lauko - acoustic piano, vocoder, writer, producer
 Kamil Peteraj - lyrics

 Jozef Hanák - sound direction
 Karol Kállay - photography
 Ali Brezovský - writer (bonus track 11, Komplet 3)
 Vlado Kolenič - writer (bonus track 12, Komplet 3)
 Ľuboš Zeman - writer (bonus track 12, Komplet 3)
 Peter Guldan - writer (bonus track 13, Komplet 3)
 J. Okoličány - writer (bonus track 14, Komplet 3)

Accolades
In 2007, Slnečný kalendár placed at number 49 on the Nový čas'' list of the 100 Greatest Slovak Albums of All Time.

References

General

Specific

1982 albums
Marika Gombitová albums